The Light Divides is the second studio album by the indie rock band Winterpills, released on February 27, 2007.

Track listing

The 14th track is an untitled track of nearly 5 minutes of silence, which precedes the final hidden track.

Personnel
Winterpills
Philip Price – vocals, acoustic guitar, keyboards
Flora Reed – vocals, keyboards, tambourine
Brian Akey – bass
Dave Hower – drums, xylophone, shaker
Dennis Crommett – electric guitar, backing vocals

Technical personnel
Jose Ayerve – engineer, bass, snare
Franck Juery – photography
Ana Price-Eckles – photography
Produced by Dave Chalfant, Winterpills
Mastered by Roger Seibel
Recorded and mixed by Dave Chalfant at Sackamusic, Conway, MA

References

External links
The Light Divides on the Winterpills website 

2007 albums
Winterpills albums